Aonidiella is a genus of scale insects in the family Diaspididae, the armored scale insects. Several species are pests of citrus.

Species include:

Aonidiella abietina
Aonidiella araucariae
Aonidiella atlantorum
Aonidiella aurantii – California red scale
Aonidiella bruni
Aonidiella citrina – yellow scale
Aonidiella comperei
Aonidiella crenata
Aonidiella ensifera
Aonidiella eremocitri
Aonidiella eugeniae
Aonidiella godfreyi
Aonidiella gracilis
Aonidiella inornata – inornate scale
Aonidiella lauretorum
Aonidiella longicorna
Aonidiella marginipora
Aonidiella messengeri
Aonidiella orientalis – Oriental yellow scale
Aonidiella pini
Aonidiella pothi
Aonidiella replicata
Aonidiella rex
Aonidiella schoutedeni
Aonidiella simplex
Aonidiella sotetsu
Aonidiella taorensis
Aonidiella taxus
Aonidiella tectaria
Aonidiella tinerfensis
Aonidiella tsugae
Aonidiella yehudithae

References

External links
California Red Scale and Yellow Scale. Pest Management Guidelines. University of California Agriculture and Natural Resources. Updated August, 2015.

Aspidiotina
Sternorrhyncha genera